Aeroflot Flight 699 was a scheduled flight, operated by Tupolev Tu-154B CCCP-85254, from Moscow Domodedovo Airport to Turkmenbashi International Airport that crashed on approach to its destination.

Accident
The aircraft made a very heavy landing and broke-up, after a poorly executed approach by an inexperienced co-pilot.

Aircraft
The accident aircraft was a Tupolev Tu-154B-1 operated by Aeroflot, registered as CCCP-85254 (msn 78A254), which was first flown in 1977 and had a total of 1589 flying hours accumulated over 8082 cycles.

Investigation
The investigation found the aircraft to be serviceable at the time of the crash with no significant faults. The crew came under the spotlight and were found to be seriously lacking in crew resource management and skills to carry out a challenging approach. The Pilot in Charge allowed an inexperienced co-pilot to carry out the approach without close supervision, which resulted in an unstable approach and very heavy landing estimated at 4.8g. The aircraft broke-up and 11 passengers were thrown from the fuselage and killed.

Causes
The primary cause of the accident was the poor crew resource management of the Pilot in Charge, who failed to closely monitor the Pilot Flying who had limited experience and skill.

Summary
The aircraft was handled poorly on the approach, had a very heavy landing and broke-up, killing 11 passengers.

References 

Aviation accidents and incidents in 1988
Aviation accidents and incidents in the Soviet Union
Accidents and incidents involving the Tupolev Tu-154
January 1988 events in Asia
1988 in the Soviet Union
Airliner accidents and incidents caused by pilot error
699